The 2016 Iowa Senate election was held on November 8, 2016.  The Senate seats for the twenty-five even-numbered districts were up for election.  Senate terms are staggered such that half the membership is elected every two years, with each Senators serving a four-year term. Prior to the election, the Democrats were in the majority.

Senate composition

Results
The election took place on November 8, 2016.  Candidate list and results  from the Iowa Secretary of State.

See also
2016 United States House of Representatives elections in Iowa
Iowa Senate
Iowa House of Representatives
Iowa General Assembly
Political party strength in U.S. states

References

2016 Iowa elections
Iowa Senate elections
Iowa Senate